Christy Onyenaturuchi Ucheibe (born 25 December 2000) is a Nigerian professional footballer who plays as a midfielder for Portuguese club Benfica.

Club career
Ucheibe played for Nasarawa Amazons in the 2018 season.

On 14 February 2020,  Ucheibe signed for Portuguese club Benfica on a three and a half years deal.

International career
Ucheibe was selected for the 2014 FIFA U-17 Women's World Cup and the 2018 FIFA U-20 Women's World Cup. In the last tournament she played three matches from the start.

Honours
Benfica
 Campeonato Nacional Feminino: 2020–21
 Taça da Liga: 2019–20, 2020–21

References

External links
 

2000 births
Living people
Women's association football midfielders
Nigerian women's footballers
Campeonato Nacional de Futebol Feminino players
S.L. Benfica (women) footballers
Nigerian expatriate women's footballers
Nigerian expatriate sportspeople in Sweden
Expatriate women's footballers in Sweden
Nigerian expatriate sportspeople in Portugal
Expatriate women's footballers in Portugal
Nasarawa Amazons F.C. players
Nigeria women's international footballers